Õunpuu is an Estonian surname. Notable people with the surname include:

Cindy Õunpuu (born 1966), Canadian-Estonian swimmer
Kethy Õunpuu (born 1987), Estonian footballer
Veiko Õunpuu (born 1972), Estonian film director and screenwriter

Estonian-language surnames